Alan Earle (born 1 September 1959) is a competitive pistol shooter from New Zealand.

At the 1998 Commonwealth Games in Kuala Lumpur he won a silver medal in the men's 25 metre rapid fire pistol pairs event, partnering Jason Wakeling.

At the 2010 Commonwealth Games in Delhi he won a silver medal in the men's 25 metre rapid fire pistol pairs event, partnering Greg Yelavich.

He also competed at the 2002 Commonwealth Games in Manchester and the 2006 Commonwealth Games in Melbourne.

References

External links 
 

1959 births
Living people
New Zealand male sport shooters
Commonwealth Games silver medallists for New Zealand
Commonwealth Games medallists in shooting
Shooters at the 1998 Commonwealth Games
Shooters at the 2002 Commonwealth Games
Shooters at the 2006 Commonwealth Games
Shooters at the 2010 Commonwealth Games
20th-century New Zealand people
21st-century New Zealand people
Medallists at the 1998 Commonwealth Games
Medallists at the 2010 Commonwealth Games